Humberto Hernández may refer to:

Humberto Hernández (cyclist) (born 1971), Colombian road cyclist
Humberto Hernández (footballer) (born 1985), Mexican football (soccer) player